The following is a list of things named for Daniel Webster.

Literature and film
 The popular short story, play and movie The Devil and Daniel Webster by Stephen Vincent Benét.

Schools and colleges
 Daniel Webster College a defunct four-year college located in Nashua, New Hampshire.
 A dormitory at Phillips Exeter Academy is named Webster Hall in honor of Daniel Webster, as is the fifth floor of Phillips Hall, which is known as the Daniel Webster Debate Room. It serves as the meeting spot for the Exeter Debate Team, which was renamed the Daniel Webster Debate Society in honor of Webster.
 The special collections library at Dartmouth College, located prominently on the campus Green, is named Webster Hall.
 Webster Hall at Southern New Hampshire University houses the School of Business and Center for Financial Studies.
 Daniel Webster High School in Tulsa, Oklahoma
 Daniel Webster Middle School (formerly Daniel Webster Junior High School) in West Los Angeles, California 
 Daniel Webster Middle School (formerly Daniel Webster Junior High School) in Waukegan, Illinois
 Daniel Webster Elementary School in Daly City, California
 Daniel Webster Elementary School in Dallas, Texas
 Daniel Webster Elementary School in San Francisco, California
 Daniel Webster Elementary School in Weehawken, New Jersey
 Daniel Webster Magnet School in New Rochelle, New York
 Daniel Webster Elementary School in his hometown of Marshfield, Massachusetts is named for him.
 Webster Elementary School, in Marshfield, Webster County, Missouri is named for him.
 Daniel Webster Elementary School in Washington, DC
 Daniel Webster School 46 in Indianapolis, Indiana
 Daniel Webster Elementary School in Logansport, Indiana (1904?-1991)

Postage stamps
 Webster appears on a total of  fourteen US postage stamps, the first one issued in 1870.

Politics 
 Webster/Sainte-Laguë method
 Webster–Ashburton Treaty
 Webster–Hayne debate

In Washington, D.C.
 Statue of Daniel Webster (U.S. Capitol): One of the two statues representing New Hampshire in the National Statuary Hall Collection in the United States Capitol.
 In 1957 a senatorial committee chaired by then-Senator John F. Kennedy named Webster as one of their five greatest predecessors, selecting Webster's oval portrait to adorn the Senate Reception Room off the Senate floor. 
 Webster Hall houses the dormitory and school for the Senate Page Program in Washington, DC. He had appointed the first Senate Page in 1829.
 A statue in a park at Massachusetts Ave., NW and 16th Street NW across from Scott Circle.

In Massachusetts
 Statue of Daniel Webster (Boston): A statue of Webster is in front of the Massachusetts State House in Boston, Massachusetts.
 Webster, Massachusetts was named in his honor by Samuel Slater on March 6, 1832.
 Thomas–Webster Estate in Marshfield
 Daniel Webster Law Office in Marshfield
 The current Daniel Webster Inn and Spa, in Sandwich, Massachusetts, on Cape Cod, replaced a 300-year-old tavern of the same name which burned in 1971. At the old building, Webster had a room reserved for his frequent visits to Cape Cod from 1815 to 1851 and the inn was later named in his honor.

In New Hampshire
 Daniel Webster's birthplace home in Franklin is preserved as a state historic site.
 A statue of Webster is in front of the New Hampshire State House in Concord, New Hampshire.
 Mount Webster, a peak in New Hampshire's White Mountains
 Daniel Webster Council, a division of the Boy Scouts of America covering most of New Hampshire
 The Daniel Webster Family Home in West Franklin, New Hampshire, declared a National Historic Landmark in 1974
 The Daniel Webster Highway, several portions of US Route 3 in New Hampshire
 Webster, New Hampshire
 Webster Lake in Franklin, NH was renamed in his honor in 1851 (formerly Clough Pond)
 The  historic Daniel Webster farm, known as The Elms, located near Franklin, New Hampshire, was also the site of the New Hampshire Home for Orphans during 1871–1959. Threatened by development in 2004–05, the property was saved by last-minute efforts by the Webster Farm Preservation Association working with the Trust for Public Land.
 The Daniel Webster Scout Trail, a hiking trail, up Mount Madison leaving from Dolly Copp Campground. The trail was constructed by Scouts of the Daniel Webster Council in 1933 and is maintained by the Appalachian Mountain Club

In New York
 Webster, a town in Monroe County, New York, was named for him (outside of Rochester, pop. 40,000)
 Statue of Daniel Webster (New York City): A bronze statue of Webster stands at 72nd Street in Central Park, New York City.

Other place names
 Webster County, Kentucky bears his name.
 Webster Parish in northwestern Louisiana is named for the statesman. Its seat of government is at Minden.
 Webster Township and Webster United Church of Christ of Dexter, Washtenaw County, Michigan, are named for Webster; he is purported to have contributed the sum of one hundred dollars to the church's construction in 1834.
 Webster Groves, Missouri was named in his honor
Webster County, Missouri bears his name.
Marshfield, county seat of Webster County, Missouri, is named after the city in Massachusetts where he lived at his death.
Webster County, Nebraska bears his name.
North Webster, Indiana bears his name.
Webster County, Iowa bears his name.
Webster County, West Virginia bears his name.
Webster, a town in Vernon County, Wisconsin, bears his name.

In Song
In 1850, John H. Hewitt wrote the song, "The Union Forever", using the theme from #21 "Per te d'immenso giubilo" from "Lucia di Lammormoor" and dedicated it to Daniel Webster.

Ships
  
 , a U.S. Navy submarine

References

Webster, Daniel
Webster, Daniel place names
Webster
Daniel Webster